Professor Vasanthy Arasaratnam is a Sri Lankan Tamil biochemist, academic and former vice-chancellor of the University of Jaffna.

Early life
Arasaratnam obtained a BSc degree from the University of Madras. She later received a MSc degree from the University of Colombo and a Phd degree from the University of Jaffna.

Career
Arasaratnam was head of Department of Biochemistry at the University of Jaffna from January 1990 to September 1996 and from October 1997 to December 2000. She was dean of the Faculty of Medicine between August 2000 and August 2003. She was head of the Department of Pharmacology in September 2003 and was elected to the university's senate in 2004. She was appointed vice-chancellor of the university in March 2011.

References

Academic staff of the University of Jaffna
Alumni of the University of Colombo
Alumni of the University of Jaffna
Living people
Sri Lankan academic administrators
Sri Lankan Tamil academics
Sri Lankan Tamil biochemists
Sri Lankan Tamil women
Sri Lankan Tamil writers
Sri Lankan women academics
Sri Lankan women scientists
University of Madras alumni
Vice-Chancellors of the University of Jaffna
Women academic administrators
Year of birth missing (living people)